Marbles is the solo recording project of The Apples in Stereo singer and chief songwriter Robert Schneider.  The project started out in 1993 when Schneider would record his various musical endeavors on cassette for various people he knew, but was somewhat abandoned as the Apples got off the ground.  He would later compile some of the songs, many of which featuring backing vocals from Will Cullen Hart of The Olivia Tremor Control, and release them officially in 1997 as an album named Pyramid Landing (And Other Favorites).

Schneider appeared to have largely abandoned the moniker by 2000, releasing sporadic singles and contributing to a compilation.  This changed when spinART released the second Marbles full length, titled Expo in January 2005.

In concert, Marbles is one of the more disorienting of the Elephant 6 bands. Most recently, touring with Of Montreal, Schneider appeared as Marbles dressed in goggles and a sequin jacket, backed by cardboard cutouts of Darth Vader and a robot, adorned with fake instruments, and a CD player supplying all but his lead vocals.

Discography

Albums
 Pyramid Landing (And Other Favorites) (CD/LP) - spinART - 1997 
 Expo (CD) - spinART - 2005

Extended plays 
 Inverse Gazebo (Cassette Only) - Elephant Six - 1993
 Warm Milk and Chocolate (Cassette Only) - Elephant Six - 1993 
 I ♥ the Animals (Cassette Only) - Elephant Six - 1993
 Marbles (Cassette Only) - Elephant Six - 1993
 Secret World (Cassette Only) - Elephant Six - 1994
 Laughing (Cassette Only) - Elephant Six - 1994

Singles
 "Go Marilee" (7") - Bus Stop - 1997 
 "I Love The Summer Days" (7") - Elephant Six - 1998 
 "Xmas with the Marbles" (7") - Bi-Fi Records - 2005
 "Happy Happy Birthday to Me Singles Club Single #02 (Split w/ Casper & the Cookies)" (7") - HHBtM Records - 2009

External links

The Elephant 6 Recording Company artists
SpinART Records artists